Rhododendron heliolepis (亮鳞杜鹃) is a rhododendron species native to Myanmar, and Sichuan, Xizang, and Yunnan in China, where it grows at altitudes of . The flowers are pink, pale purple-red, or rarely white, with purple or brown spots inside.

References
 "Rhododendron heliolepis", Franchet, Bull. Soc. Bot. France. 34: 283. 1887.

heliolepis